My Sister, My Love is a 1966 Swedish drama film, directed by Vilgot Sjöman.

Cast
 Bibi Andersson – Charlotte
 Per Oscarsson – Jacob
 Jarl Kulle – Karl Ulrik Alsmeden
 Tina Hedström – Ebba Livin
 Gunnar Björnstrand – Count Schwartz
 Rune Lindström – Samuel Zacharias Storck

Censorship 
When Syskonbädd 1782 was first released in Italy in 1971 the Committee for the Theatrical Review of the Italian Ministry of Cultural Heritage and Activities rated it as VM18: not suitable for children under 18. In addition, the committee imposed the removal of the following scene: the scene in which Jacob is in bed with two naked women.

The commission stated that the movie is of great artistic value and does not allow provocative elements to emerge from the narration (which is about a pathological relationship between brother and sister). On the contrary, the movie features a good moral ending in which the female character is punished with death while giving birth to the fruit of her sinful love. Document N° 49587 signed on 28 August 1967  by Minister Adolfo Sarti.

References

External links

1966 drama films
1966 films
Films directed by Vilgot Sjöman
Films set in the 1780s
Fiction set in 1782
Incest in film
1960s Swedish-language films
Swedish historical drama films
1960s historical drama films
1960s Swedish films